Ahmet Murat Çakar (born 3 August 1962) is a Turkish doctor, sportscaster, actor and a former football referee. According to IFFHS, he is one of the world's best referees of the quarter of a century. Described as "Turkey's most controversial football pundit", he is famous for his bold claims and humorous manner, and is popular in Turkey both as a pundit and an internet meme.

Biography
He was born in Istanbul in August 3, 1962. He completed his high school education at Istanbul Erkek Lisesi in 1980. He then graduated from the Faculty of Medicine at Istanbul University. 

He is famous for the abrasive but funny manner in which he presents the Show TV sports programme Altıpas, being described as "Turkey's most controversial football pundit". He also writes sports articles for Sabah newspaper. He is a medical doctor as well. Currently he is a commentator on the Turkish football television programme Beyaz Futbol, on Beyaz TV. According to IFFHS, he is one of the world's best referees of the quarter of a century.

Controversy

Attempted assassination 
In February 25, 2004, he was attacked in an attempted assassination with five bullets hitting him directly, however, he survived. He later commented on the matter saying that he knows nothing about who was behind it, but he believed he is extremely famous. He also stated that his near death experience strenghtened his faith in Allah.

Bikini controversy 
In 2008 Çakar challenged Fenerbahçe on live TV. He stated that if Fenerbahçe qualifies for the Quarter-finals in the UEFA Champions League, he will wear a bikini. That year, Fenerbahçe qualified for the quarter-finals, and photoshopped images of Çakar in a bikini were shown in newspapers. A bikini company, sunset mayo, announced that they will be "more than happy to help Mr. Çakar keep his promise". Another swimsuit company, Zeki Triko, sent their most expensive swimsuit to Çakar for free, adding that it is "merely worthy of his excellence".

Çakar subsequently received hundreds of packages of gifts made up of swimwear. He later stated that "it was merely a joke, come on, gentlemen". He also stated that he liked and laughed at the jokes and images, but was scared of his wife's reaction. In 2015, Fenerbahçe released a video making fun of Çakar and reminding him that he still hasn't kept his promise.

UEFA 2013 quarter-final draws controversy 
In March 2013, Çakar appeared on TV claiming that the draws for the quarter-finals of UEFA's club competitions had been fixed by those making the draw "carrying metal objects that sensed vibrations in the balls being selected."

Claims about aliens and Saddam Hussein 
In 2014, Çakar claimed in a football discussion that Saddam Hussein is secretly alive, and that aliens are real. Claiming that his knowledge about aliens is deepy rooted, he added that "the aliens changed their ways, they now disguise themselves as aliens. Maybe they want to help us. They are protecting Obama."

Albert Einstein controversy 
In 2015, he claimed on live TV that "Albert Einstein was a genius who changed the world. But in the end, he was a lowly human who treated his wife like a dog! People who are successful in public are often rotten in their private life."

Rap controversy 
In 2015, he controversially stated on live TV that "Rap is utter disgrace. Nobody can tell me rap is art. Rap is not art. Rap is buffoonery. Whoever raps or listens to rap was probably had problems when they were little." He later targeted popular rapper Sagopa Kajmer and said "why would you name yourself "Sagopa Kajmer"? Proves that you are broken". This caused a spark of outrage, and multiple rappers demanded that he should apologise. Some celebrities supported him, stating that he was simply joking. Çakar responded by saying "95 percent of you rappers are broken. 90-95 percent of you have severe psychological or physical trauma as a child. Your looks are broken. Most of you do not take showers, you are filthy. Some of you are drug addicts". These statements caused even more controversy.

Fly eating controversy 
In May 2022, while commenting on a match between Fenerbahçe and Beşiktaş in live TV, a horse fly was seen flying around the studio. As the program continued, Çakar remarked, "If that fly passes through my airspace, I'll do what I have to". The fly then approached Çakar, who grabbed the fly and ate it. Sinan Engin reacted by saying "good for you, free vitamins" while Rasim Ozan Kütahyalı, who was also present, held his vomit and silently remarked "may Allah destroy you". The event provoked criticism as well as support from the public and evolved into a scandal. When interviewed later, Çakar remarked "I am not easily disgusted. By God, I have eaten worse things, but the public is not ready for it."

Glasses controversy 
In 2022, after Ertem Şener, the presenter, asked Çakar, "How are the glasses cleaned?", Çakar took off his glasses and started licking it. Everyone in the room questioned what he was doing, but he ignored the criticism. The glasses did not belong to Çakar.

Major matches refereed

Television career

Acting career

TV Shows

References

External links 
 
 
 

1962 births
Living people
Sports commentators
Turkish journalists
Turkish football referees
Sabah (newspaper) people
UEFA Euro 1996 referees
Turkish people of Circassian descent